The Farmer is a 1977 American crime action film directed by David Berlatsky and starring Gary Conway, Angel Tompkins, Michael Dante, and George Memmoli. The film was released by Columbia Pictures on March 9, 1977. The revenge thriller is probably best remembered for its lack of a home media release, as the film never had a release on VHS, Beta, Laserdisc, DVD, or any other release outside of theaters for years until a limited edition Blu-Ray was released by Scorpion Releasing in early 2022.

Plot
Decorated World War II veteran Kyle Martin returns homes with a Silver Star to Georgia to start a farm, but realizes running a one-man farm isn't profitable, and the bank needs to foreclose, despite his being a veteran. At that point a gambler named Johnny has an auto crash close to the farm, in which Kyle spares his life. Johnny offers him $1,500, which actually isn't sufficient to spare the homestead.

At this time, Johnny past-posts mobster Passini on a horse race for $50,000. This angers Passini who along with his three colleagues, murders Johnny's bodyguard, and blinds Johnny's eyes with corrosive acid to "make a example out of him".

Johnny asks his mistress Betty to hire Kyle so he can kill to Passini and his men individually for $50,000, which he needs to save his farm. Kyle is initially reluctant to do so. However, one of Passini's men by the name of Weasel rapes Betty at Kyle's farm.  Weasel then kills the farmhand Gumshoe while trying to save Betty, then burns down the farm.

After arriving in time to save Betty from the burning farm and surveying through the burnt wreckage the next day, Kyle finally accepts Johnny's offer which sets the path for revenge.

Cast

Gary Conway as Kyle Martin
Angel Tompkins as Betty
Michael Dante as Johnny O.
George Memmoli as Passini
Lewell Akins as Conductor
Dave Graig as 2nd Soldier
Stratton Leopold as Laundry Sam
Ray McIver as Train Bartender
Bill Moses as Bank Representative
Judge Parker as Banjo Player
Don Payne as Mr. Moore
Louis C. Pessolano as Bartender
Johnny Popwell as Conners
Ken Renard as Gumshoe
Timothy Scott as Weasel
Sonny Shroyer as Corrigan
Wayne Stewart as Sergeant
Roy Tatum as Soldier
Jack Waltzer as Doc Valentine
Eric Weston as Lopie
Laura Whyte as Waitress

Release

Theatrical release 
The film was theatrically released on March 9, 1977, by Columbia Pictures.

DVD 
In 2006, Code Red announced a release of the film on DVD, posting 10 screenshots on their blog, but this never happened.

Blue Ray
Distributor Scorpion Releasing released the film on Blu-ray Disc in February 2022.

See also 
List of American films of 1977

References

External links

1977 films
1977 action films
1977 directorial debut films
1970s crime action films
1970s English-language films
American crime action films
Columbia Pictures films
American rape and revenge films
Films scored by Hugo Montenegro
Films set in Georgia (U.S. state)
Films set in the 1940s
Films shot in Georgia (U.S. state)
Rediscovered American films
1970s rediscovered films
1970s American films